Rollin' Lonely is a song written by J.D. Martin and Gary Harrison, and recorded by American country music artist Johnny Lee. It was released in December 1984 as the second single from the album Workin' for a Livin. The song reached number 9 on the Billboard Hot Country Singles & Tracks chart.

Content
One of many songs in country music to pay homage to the American truck driver, the song focuses on the separation-from-family aspect of the profession. Here, a truck driver tells about how he has covered 400 miles since early morning and is determined to cover the remaining 300 miles to arrive home by evening to be with his wife, paying little-to-no heed to the then national speed limit of 55 mph and the weather (he's driving through a pouring rain) while reflecting on the sadness both he and his wife feel prior to his departing for a long trip.

Chart performance

References

1985 singles
1984 songs
Johnny Lee (singer) songs
Songs written by Gary Harrison
Song recordings produced by Jimmy Bowen
Warner Records singles
Songs written by J. D. Martin (songwriter)